Diego Cosgaya (born 27 January 1987) is a Spanish sprint canoer who has competed since the late 2000s. He won a gold medal in the K-2 1000 m event at the 2009 ICF Canoe Sprint World Championships in Dartmouth, Nova Scotia.

References
Canoe09.ca profile
Official webpage of Diego Cosgaya

1987 births
Living people
Spanish male canoeists
ICF Canoe Sprint World Championships medalists in kayak
Mediterranean Games bronze medalists for Spain
Competitors at the 2013 Mediterranean Games
Mediterranean Games medalists in canoeing
20th-century Spanish people
21st-century Spanish people